The Xinxiang–Heze–Yanzhou–Rizhao railway, also known as the Xinxiang–Shijiusuo or Xinshi railway is the combined Xinxiang–Yanzhou and Yanzhou–Shijiusuo railways in Henan and Shandong Province of China.

References

Railway lines in China
Rail transport in Henan
Rail transport in Shandong